The Sopore Fruit Market is the biggest economic hub for Kashmir. The yearly turnover is approximately Rs 2600 Crore. It is the largest wholesale fruit market  in Kashmir, and the second-largest in Asia after Azadpur in Delhi.

It was founded by Ghulam Mustafa.

References 

Markets in India